Sylvia Tyson,  (née Fricker; born 19 September 1940) is a Canadian musician, performer, singer-songwriter and broadcaster. She is best known as part of the folk duo Ian and Sylvia, with Ian Tyson. Since 1993, she has been a member of the all-female folk group Quartette.

Early life
Tyson was born Sylvia Fricker in Chatham, Ontario, the second of four children. Her father was an appliance salesman for the T. Eaton Company, and her mother was a church organist and choir leader. At a young age Fricker decided to become a singer. Although her parents tried to discourage her from pursuing a career as an entertainer, she left Chatham in 1959 to perform in Toronto.

Ian and Sylvia

From 1959 to 1974, she was half of the popular folk duo Ian & Sylvia with Ian Tyson. The two met after a friend of Tyson heard her sing at a party and let Ian know about her. Tyson had been performing in Toronto clubs as a solo artist, but after he and Fricker met, they decided to work together as a duo. Their full-time collaboration began in 1961 and continued for a decade. From the late 1960s to the early 1970s, she and Ian Tyson also fronted the country rock band Great Speckled Bird.

Sylvia Tyson wrote her first and best-known song "You Were on My Mind" in 1962. It was recorded by Ian & Sylvia in 1964. The song has been covered extensively, but first became a hit single in the mid-1960s for the San Francisco-based folk-rock band We Five, and also for the British pop singer Crispian St. Peters.

Fricker married Ian Tyson on 26 June 1964. During their years together, they recorded 13 albums. 

The Tysons were divorced in 1975. During their marriage, they had one child, Clayton Dawson Tyson.

Later career
After the Tysons separated and stopped performing together in 1975, Sylvia started a solo career. She released two albums through Capitol Records, Woman's World in 1975 and Cool Wind from the North in 1976. In 1978, she established an independent record label, Salt Records. Through that label, she released the albums, Satin on Stone in 1978 and Sugar for Sugar in 1979.

Sylvia Tyson contributed offstage to the Canadian music scene as a board member of FACTOR and the Juno Awards. With Tom Russell, she was an editor of the 1995 anthology And Then I Wrote: The Songwriter Speaks. In 2011, she wrote her first novel, Joyner's Dream.

Sylvia joined Ian to sing their signature song "Four Strong Winds" at the 50th anniversary of the Mariposa Folk Festival on 11 July 2010 in Orillia, Ontario.

In 2012, Tyson and singer-songwriter Cindy Church wrote a campaign song for the Alberta Party, a centrist political party in Alberta.

Awards and recognition 
Sylvia Tyson was made a member of the Order of Canada in 1994.

She was nominated seven times for a Juno Award, the first being in 1987 as Country Female Vocalist of the Year.

The Canadian Music Hall of Fame inducted Ian & Sylvia as a duo in 1992. In 2003, Sylvia Tyson was inducted into the Canadian Country Music Hall of Fame.

In July 2019, it was announced that Ian Tyson and Sylvia Tyson would be inducted into the Songwriters Hall of Fame, individually, not as a duo. The Canadian Broadcasting Corporation stated that "the duo's 1964's hit, Four Strong Winds, has been deemed one of the most influential songs in Canadian history". The CBC report also referenced the song You Were on My Mind, written by Sylvia Tyson, as well as her four albums (1975–1980).

Discography

Albums

Singles

References

External links
Sylvia's Profile at Quartette's web-site
Sylvia Tyson on The Canadian Encyclopedia
An interview with Sylvia Tyson
CBC interview with Sylvia on the early years of Can-Con (important because of Sylvia's contribution to the organisational side of Canadian music
Sylvia Tyson on Canoe.ca
Quartette

 
Sylvia Tyson Interview NAMM Oral History Library (2021)

1940 births
Living people
Musicians from Ontario
People from Chatham-Kent
Canadian women country singers
Canadian women singer-songwriters
Canadian folk singer-songwriters
Canadian folk guitarists
Canadian country singer-songwriters
Canadian women folk guitarists
Members of the Order of Canada
Great Speckled Bird (band) members
Quartette (band) members
20th-century Canadian women singers
21st-century Canadian women singers
Autoharp players